The canton of Bonnieux is a French administrative division in the department of Vaucluse and region Provence-Alpes-Côte d'Azur. It had 4,317 inhabitants (2012). It was disbanded following the French canton reorganisation which came into effect in March 2015. It consisted of 6 communes, which joined the canton of Apt in 2015.

Composition
The communes in the canton of Bonnieux:
Bonnieux
Buoux
Lacoste
Ménerbes
Oppède
Sivergues

References

Bonnieux
2015 disestablishments in France
States and territories disestablished in 2015